Association Sportive Vaiete is a football club from Papeete, Tahiti. It currently competes in the Tahiti Ligue 2,the second tier of Tahitian football.

History
AS Vaiete was founded in 1926 in the Papeete city. The colors of the club are white, yellow, red and black.

Titles

In 1974, the club was champion of Tahiti Cup.

The other title came in the 2007/08 season, when the club won the Ligue 2 title.

References

Football clubs in Tahiti
Football clubs in French Polynesia